Hoplopteron is a small genus of sea snails, marine gastropod mollusks in the family Eulimidae.

Species

Species within this genus include the following:

 Hoplopteron alifera (Thiele, 1925)
 Hoplopteron terquemi (P. Fischer, 1876)

References

External links
 To World Register of Marine Species

Eulimidae